Angelo Miceli (born 1 March 1994) is a Canadian-born Italian professional ice hockey player currently under contract with HC Bolzano in the ICE Hockey League (ICEHL). Internationally he has played for the Italian national team.

He represented Italy at the 2019 IIHF World Championship.

References

External links

1994 births
Living people
Atlanta Gladiators players
Bolzano HC players
Brampton Beast players
Greenville Swamp Rabbits players
Italian ice hockey forwards
Norfolk Admirals (ECHL) players
Ice hockey people from Montreal
St. John's IceCaps players
Texas Stars players
Victoriaville Tigres players